Bartolo is a barrio in the municipality of Lares, Puerto Rico. Its population in 2010 was 2,035. Bartolo is on the southeastern border of Lares and Adjuntas.

History
Puerto Rico was ceded by Spain in the aftermath of the Spanish–American War under the terms of the Treaty of Paris of 1898 and became an unincorporated territory of the United States. In 1899, the United States Department of War conducted a census of Puerto Rico finding that the population of Bartolo barrio was 2,035.

Sectors
Barrios (which are roughly comparable to minor civil divisions) and subbarrios, in turn, are further subdivided into smaller local populated place areas/units called sectores (sectors in English). The types of sectores may vary, from normally sector to urbanización to reparto to barriada to residencial, among others.

The following sectors are in Bartolo barrio:

, and
.

Jíbaros Mutual Support Center
The , a school that was built in 1922 was closed in 2015 by the Puerto Rico Department of Education. A group of residents, who farm the land (jíbaros), rehabilitated the school and put it to use, after they were left homeless when their homes were destroyed by Hurricane Maria in September 2017. The group received support from a number of businesses including a donation of solar panels. With their work, the once abandoned school is now called the Jíbaros Mutual Support Center, and the classrooms serve as residences to eleven families (to families with a woman head of household and to elderly). There are micro-businesses, including a theater, operating from the location. Members of the local Presbyterian church who spearheaded the grassroots movement for Bartolo are pursuing official ownership of the property. Similar Mutual Support Centers have popped up around the island.

See also

 List of communities in Puerto Rico
 List of barrios and sectors of Lares, Puerto Rico

References

External links

Barrios of Lares, Puerto Rico